Prijevor is a village in the municipality of Herceg Novi, Montenegro. It is located close to the Croatian border.

Demographics
According to the 2011 census, its population was 104.

References

Populated places in Herceg Novi Municipality
Populated places in Bay of Kotor
Mediterranean port cities and towns in Montenegro
Coastal towns in Montenegro